John Allen Amos Jr. (born December 27, 1939) is an American actor known for his role as James Evans Sr. on the CBS television series Good Times. Amos's other television work includes The Mary Tyler Moore Show, a recurring role as Admiral Percy Fitzwallace on The West Wing, and the role of Washington DC Mayor Ethan Baker in the series The District. Amos has appeared on Broadway and in numerous films in his five-decade career. He has been nominated for a Primetime Emmy Award and an NAACP Image Award.  On film, he has played numerous supporting roles in movies such as The Beastmaster (1982), Coming to America (1988), Die Hard 2 (1990) and Coming 2 America (2021). Prior to his acting career, Amos played college football at Colorado State University. He also had a brief professional football career which included spending a portion of the 1967 offseason for the American Football League's Kansas City Chiefs.

Early life
Amos was born on December 27, 1939, in Newark, New Jersey, the son of Annabelle and John A. Amos Sr., an auto mechanic. He grew up in East Orange, New Jersey, and graduated from East Orange High School in 1958. He enrolled at Long Beach City College and graduated from Colorado State University, qualifying as a social worker with a degree in sociology. Amos also played on the Colorado State Rams football team. After college, he was a Golden Gloves boxing champion.

Football career

In 1964, Amos signed a free agent contract with the American Football League's Denver Broncos. Unable to run the 40-yard dash because of a pulled hamstring, he was released on the second day of training camp. He then played with the Canton Bulldogs and Joliet Explorers of the United Football League. In 1965, he played with the Norfolk Neptunes and Wheeling Ironmen of the Continental Football League. In 1966, he played with the Jersey City Jets and Waterbury Orbits of the Atlantic Coast Football League.

In 1967, Amos signed a free agent contract with the American Football League's Kansas City Chiefs. Coach Hank Stram told him, "You're not a football player, you're a man who is trying to play football." He returned to the Continental League, where he played that year with the Victoria Steelers.

Acting career

Amos became well known in his first major TV role, playing Gordy Howard, the weatherman on The Mary Tyler Moore Show,  from 1970 until 1973.  Upon the death of Betty White, Amos and Joyce Bulifant (who played Marie Slaughter) became the last surviving semi-regular cast members of that show (not counting child actors). In 1971, he appeared with Anson Williams in a commercial for McDonald's. But he is best known for his portrayal of James Evans Sr., the husband of Florida Evans, first appearing three times on the sitcom Maude before continuing the role in 61 episodes of Good Times from 1974 to 1976.

Good Times (1974–1976)
Although cast as a hard-working middle-aged father of three, Amos was 34 when the show began production in 1973, only eight years older than the actor who played his oldest son (Jimmie Walker) and 19 years younger than his screen wife (Esther Rolle). Much like Rolle, Amos wanted to portray a positive image of an African-American family, struggling against the odds in a poor neighborhood, but saw the premise slighted by lower comedy, and he expressed dissatisfaction.

During his tenure on Good Times, Amos openly clashed with the writers of the show, due to the scripts' lack of authenticity in portraying the African-American experience. This led to his dismissal by executive producer Norman Lear at the end of season 3 in 1976.  In a 2017 interview, Amos said he had told the writers, who, according to Amos, did not understand African-Americans, "That just doesn't happen in the community. We don't think that way. We don't act that way. We don't let our children do that."

In 1980, he starred in the TV film Alcatraz: The Whole Shocking Story. Amos played an Archie Bunker-style character in the 1994 sitcom 704 Hauser, a modern spin-off of All In The Family, but it was canceled after only five episodes (in the series he played a different character than he did in the All in the Family spin-off Maude). He also portrayed Captain Dolan on the TV show Hunter from 1984 to 1985. He co-starred in the CBS police drama The District. Amos was a frequent guest on The West Wing, portraying Admiral Percy Fitzwallace, who serves as Chairman of the Joint Chiefs of Staff for most of the show. He played Buzz Washington in the ABC series Men in Trees. Amos co-starred with Anthony Anderson in the short-lived TV series All About the Andersons in 2003. In 2010, Amos also appeared as recurring character Ed on Two and a Half Men, and in 2016 as another recurring character, also (coincidentally) named Ed, on the Netflix sitcom The Ranch. He has guest-starred in a number of other television shows, including Police Story, The A-Team, The Cosby Show, The Fresh Prince of Bel-Air, In the House, Martin as Sgt. Hamilton Strawn (Tommy's father), Touched by an Angel, Psych, Sanford And Son, My Name Is Earl, Lie to Me, and Murder, She Wrote. He has also appeared as a spokesman for the Cochran Firm (a national personal injury law firm). Amos wrote and produced Halley's Comet, a critically acclaimed one-man play that he has performed around the world. Amos performed in August Wilson's Gem of the Ocean on Broadway and later at the McCarther Theatre in Princeton, New Jersey.

Film roles, music

Amos starred in the TV Miniseries Roots, as the adult Kunta Kinte, based on the book and real life family history of author Alex Haley. Amos was featured in Disney's The World's Greatest Athlete (1973) with Tim Conway and Jan-Michael Vincent, and also starred as Kansas City Mack in Let's Do It Again (1975) with Bill Cosby and Sidney Poitier. His other film appearances include Vanishing Point (1971), The President's Plane Is Missing (1973), Touched by Love (1980), The Beastmaster (1982), Dance of the Dwarfs (1983), American Flyers (1985), Coming to America (1988), Lock Up (1989), Two Evil Eyes (1989), Die Hard 2 (1990), and Ricochet (1991). He appeared in the 1995 film For Better or Worse and played a police officer in The Players Club (1998). He played Uncle Virgil in My Baby's Daddy (2004), and starred as Jud in Dr. Dolittle 3 (2006). In 2012, Amos had a role in the movie Madea's Witness Protection, as Jake's father. He also appeared in Ice Cube and Dr. Dre's 1994 video for "Natural Born Killaz."

In 2009, he released We Were Hippies, an album of original country songs by Gene and Eric Cash.

In 2021, Amos starred in Because of Charley, as the patriarch of an estranged step-family riding out the hurricane that tore through Florida in 2004.

Awards
In addition to his Emmy nomination for Roots, Amos has also been nominated for a CableACE award, an NAACP Image Award, and a DVD Exclusive Award. Amos has won three TV Land Awards, taking home trophies for his roles on The Mary Tyler Moore Show, Good Times and the TV miniseries Roots.

In 2020, Amos was inducted into the New Jersey Hall of Fame.

Personal life
Amos is a veteran of the 50th Armored Division of the New Jersey National Guard and Honorary Master Chief of the United States Coast Guard.

Amos has been married twice. His first marriage, from 1965 to 1975, was to artist and equestrian Noel Mickelson, with whom he has two children: Shannon Amos, a writer/producer and founder of Afterglow Multimedia, LLC, and Grammy-nominated director K.C. Amos. His second marriage, from 1978 to 1979, was to actress Lillian Lehman.

Amos lived for many years in Tewksbury Township, New Jersey. , he resides in Westcliffe, Colorado.

Filmography

Film

Television

References

External links
 
 
 
 
 
 

1939 births
20th-century American male actors
21st-century American male actors
20th-century African-American sportspeople
21st-century African-American people
Actors from East Orange, New Jersey
African-American male actors
African-American players of American football
American male film actors
American male stage actors
American football running backs
American male television actors
Colorado Democrats
Colorado State Rams football players
Continental Football League players
East Orange High School alumni
Kansas City Chiefs players
Living people
Long Beach City College alumni
Male actors from Newark, New Jersey
New Jersey National Guard personnel
New Jersey Democrats
People from Tewksbury Township, New Jersey
Players of American football from Newark, New Jersey
United Football League (1961–1964) players
United States Army soldiers